Ormosia panamensis, commonly known as coronil or sur espino, is a species of flowering plant in the family Fabaceae.
It is found in Costa Rica, Guatemala, Mexico, and Panama.

References

panamensis
Flora of Central America
Flora of Southeastern Mexico
Flora of Southwestern Mexico
Flora of Costa Rica
Flora of Guatemala
Flora of Panama
Least concern plants
Taxonomy articles created by Polbot